Chocolate liquor (cocoa liquor) is pure cocoa mass (cocoa paste) in solid or semi-solid form.  Like the cocoa beans (nibs) from which it is produced, it contains both cocoa solids and cocoa butter in roughly equal proportion.

It is produced from cocoa beans that have been fermented, dried, roasted, and separated from their skins.  The beans are ground into cocoa mass (cocoa paste).  The mass is melted to become the liquor, and the liquor is either separated into cocoa solids and cocoa butter, or cooled and molded into blocks of raw chocolate. Its main use (often with additional cocoa butter) is in making chocolate.

The name liquor is used not in the sense of a distilled, alcoholic substance, but rather the older meaning of the word, meaning 'liquid' or 'fluid'.

Chocolate liquor contains roughly 53 percent cocoa butter (fat), about 17 percent carbohydrates, 11 percent protein, 6 percent tannins, and 1.5 percent theobromine.

See also
 Types of chocolate

References

Components of chocolate